Thoressa astigmata, the southern spotted ace, is a butterfly belonging to the family Hesperiidae. The species was first described by Charles Swinhoe in 1890. It is endemic to the Western Ghats of India and is found in the states of Kerala, Tamil Nadu and Karnataka.

Description

Life history
The larva has been recorded on Ochlandra talbotii and Ochlandra travancorica.

Gallery

References

astigmata
Butterflies of Asia
Taxa named by Charles Swinhoe
Butterflies described in 1890